Norden Tenzing Bhutia was a musician, composer and singer of classic Nepali pop songs like 'Musu Musu Hasi Deu', 'Gajalu le Aakhai Chopne', 'Kaha Timro Mayalu Lai'. In the 70's Bhutia was the vocalist and guitarist of the very popular Nepali ensemble, The Himalayans. Bhutia is credited with transforming Nepali music and heralding a change in musical taste and content. Bhutia was one of the pioneers to introduce rock, pop and blues to Nepali mainstream music.

Life and career 
Bhutia was born in Kolkata on 21 January 1950 and raised in Kurseong (Darjeeling). He joined the British Army in 1971 and after serving as a British Gurkha soldier in Her Majesty's Armed Forces, settled in Aldershot, UK and started his own business. Bhutia is survived by his wife and three children.

Bhutia started his musical career after joining the British Army, where he met likeminded Nepalese musicians and formed The Himalayans. He had his first hit with "Gajalule Akhai Chopne", other songs that he was best known for include "Musu Musu Hasi Deu", "Gajalu Le Akhai Chopne", and "Kaha Timro Mayalu Lai".

Bhutia died in Aldershot, Rushmoor Borough, UK on August 4, 2019.

See also 
Music of Nepal
British Army
Brigade of Gurkhas

References 

Nepali-language singers
Indian Gorkhas
People from Darjeeling district
Singers from West Bengal
20th-century Indian male singers
20th-century Indian singers
1950 births
2019 deaths
Nepali-language singers from India